"Tip Toe" is a song by American singer and songwriter Jason Derulo, featuring vocals from Moroccan-American rapper French Montana, released on November 10, 2017. Derulo and Montana co-wrote the song with Soaky Siren, Johnny Mitchell, and its producers Pip Kembo and Bantu.

Live performances
On April 12, 2018, Derulo performed the song live during a medley with "Swalla" and "Colors" at the German Echo Music Prize.

Music video
A lyric video for "Tip Toe", purportedly directed by Derulo himself, was released on November 10, 2017 to accompany the release of the single. A follow up, more elaborate official music video was then released on YouTube on December 7, 2017, at a total length of three minutes and thirty-seven seconds.

Track listing

Charts

Weekly charts

Year-end charts

Certifications

Release history

References

2017 singles
2017 songs
Warner Records singles
Jason Derulo songs
Songs written by French Montana
Songs written by Jason Derulo
Songs written by Tinashe Sibanda